La Maison du Bonheur (The House of Happiness) is a 2006 French comedy film directed by Dany Boon, adapted from the play La Vie de chantier (Life on a building site).

Plot
Charles Boulin is a debt collector for a credit company called Crédilem.

After his wife Anne accuses him of being tight-fisted, he decides to surprise her by buying a house in the country... but before he manages to do so the house is snatched up by one of his colleagues.  In his disappointment he steals his colleague's bag which contains the signed deeds.  As he has already been given several warnings at work, he is sacked on the spot.

To reduce renovation costs, Charles Boulin seeks the help of Jean-Pierre Draquart, the shifty estate agent who sold him the second house in his catalogue.  This swindler calls up his "best team": Mouloud Mami and Donatello Pirelli - who as workers are both perfectly incompetent.  As the renovation progresses, the house gradually turns into ruins.

Charles soon finds himself in debt after being refused a bank loan and then has to sell the family apartment without letting his wife or daughter find out. He survives on odd jobs, whilst scheming in order to convince his family to move into the "new" house...

Cast
 Dany Boon as Charles Boulin
 Michèle Laroque as Anne Boulin
 Daniel Prévost as Jean-Pierre Draquart
 Zinedine Soualem as Mouloud Mami
 Laurent Gamelon as Donatello Pirelli
 Line Renaud as Aunt Suzanne Bailleul
 Michel Vuillermoz as Jacques Kurtz
 Ariane Séguillon as Nicole Kurtz
 Gaëlle Bona as Élisabeth
 Antoine Chappey as Alexis Boulin
 Laure Sirieix as Norah Boulin
 Frédéric Bouraly as The doctor
 Jacqueline Jehanneuf as The house owner
 Jean Dell as The notary
 Didier Flamand as Banker

Box office

Discography
The CD soundtrack, including the scores of Nothing to Declare and Bienvenue chez les Ch'tis, all composed by Philippe Rombi.

References

External links
 

2006 films
2006 comedy films
French comedy films
2000s French-language films
Films directed by Dany Boon
Films set in France
Films shot in France
Films produced by Claude Berri
French films based on plays
Pathé films
2000s French films